Phyllonorycter rolandi is a moth of the family Gracillariidae. It is known from Fennoscandia and the European part of Russia.

The larvae feed on Salix lapponum.

References

rolandi
Moths of Europe
Moths described in 1966